Auber may refer to:

 Brigitte Auber (born 1928), French actress
 Daniel Auber (1782–1871), French composer
 Harriet Auber (1773–1862), English poet and hymnist
 Auber (Paris RER), a Paris railway station
 Auber, short for Aubervilliers, a commune in Seine-Saint-Denis, Île-de-France

See also

 Aubers

Surnames of Norman origin